Cádiz is a Spanish appellation describing Vino de la Tierra wines whose terroir is located in the autonomous region of Andalusia. Vino de la Tierra is one step below the mainstream Denominación de Origen indication on the Spanish wine quality ladder.

The area covered by this geographical indication comprises the following municipalities: Arcos de la Frontera, Chiclana de la Frontera, Chipiona, El Puerto de Santa María, Jerez de la Frontera Prado del Rey, Puerto Real, Rota, Sanlúcar de Barrameda, Olvera, Setenil, Villamartín, Bornos, Trebujena and San José del Valle, in the province of Cádiz (Andalusia, Spain).

It acquired its Vino de la Tierra status in 2005.

Grape varieties

 Red: Syrah, Monastrell, Merlot, Tintilla de Rota, Petit Verdot Cabernet Franc, Garnacha tinta, Tempranillo and Cabernet Sauvignon
 White: Garrido, Palomino, Chardonnay, Moscatel, Mantía, Perruno, Macabeo, Sauvignon blanc and Pedro Ximénez.

References

Spanish wine
Wine regions of Spain
Wine-related lists
Appellations